The 2020 Middle East storms happened on 12 March 2020 and the following days, bringing heavy rain, thunderstorms, floods, and sandstorms, to northern Egypt, Jordan, Israel, syria, Lebanon, State of Palestine and Iraq. They are sometimes called "The Dragon" or the "Dragon storms", a name which arose in social media.
The storm system, a large severe cyclone, formed over the Nile delta and around on 12 March 2020 and over the next days moved northeast over the Middle East.

The storm system killed at least 21 people in Egypt.

It caused snow in mountain areas such as in  uppear Galille and in Palestinian West bank, Lebanon and Syria and jordan and Iran and the Tabuk area in Saudi Arabia.

Impacts

Egypt
Almost 20 people died. Luxor International Airport and Alexandria port and Sharm el-Sheikh port closed.

Iraq
Youtube video: Flooding in Mosul, Iraq - heavy rains bring snakes and floods

Iran
Youtube video: Iranian floods: heavy rains bring flash flooding throughout Iran

Kurdistan
Images of flood damage in Duhok

Lebanon
Flood damage in Lebanon

Oman
20.51 minute Youtube video of supercell storm in Oman

United Arab Emirates
22.37 minute Youtube video of storm in Dubai and the United Arab Emirates

Yemen
10.55 minute Youtube video Floods in Aden, Yemen: Torrential water destroys houses and buildings, March 25 2020

References

2020 meteorology
2020 natural disasters
2020 in Egypt
2020 in Iraqi Kurdistan
2020 in Israel
2020 in Jordan
2020 in Lebanon
2020 in the State of Palestine
2020 in Syria
March 2020 events in Asia
March 2020 events in Africa
Storms